Matelea jaramilloi is a species of plant in the family Apocynaceae. It is endemic to Ecuador.  Its natural habitat is subtropical or tropical moist lowland forests. It is threatened by habitat loss.

References

jaramilloi
Endemic flora of Ecuador
Near threatened plants
Near threatened biota of South America
Taxonomy articles created by Polbot